Columbellopsis nycteis, common name : the fenestrate dove shell, is a species of sea snail, a marine gastropod mollusk in the family Columbellidae, the dove snails.

Description
The shell size is up to 8 mm.

Distribution
This species is distributed in the Indian Ocean along Madagascar and in the Caribbean Sea, the West Indies and in the Gulf of Mexico.

References

 Dautzenberg, Ph. (1929). Mollusques testaces marins de Madagascar. Faune des Colonies Francaises, Tome III
 Rosenberg, G., F. Moretzsohn, and E. F. García. 2009. Gastropoda (Mollusca) of the Gulf of Mexico, pp. 579–699 in Felder, D.L. and D.K. Camp (eds.), Gulf of Mexico–Origins, Waters, and Biota. Biodiversity. Texas A&M Press, College Station, Texas

External links
 

Columbellidae
Gastropods described in 1846